Bet Dwarka (also spelled Beyt Dwarka) or Shankhodhar is an inhabited island at the mouth of the Gulf of Kutch, situated  off the coast of the town of Okha, Gujarat, India, and  north of the city of Dwarka. The island's name "Shankhodhar" derives from the fact that the island is a large source of conch shells.

History 

Bet Dwarka is considered to be part of the ancient city of Dvārakā. In Indian epic literature such as the Mahabharata and the Skanda Purana, this city is the abode of Krishna. Gujarati scholar Umashankar Joshi suggested that Antardvipa in the Sabha Parva of the Mahabharata can be identified as Bet Dwarka, as the Yadavas of Dwarka are said to have travelled to it by boat.

Undersea archaeological remains suggest the existence of a settlement during the Late Harappan period of Indus Valley civilization, or immediately after it. The settlement can be reliably dated to the time of the Maurya Empire, as a part of Okha Mandal or Kushdwip area. Dwarka is mentioned in a copper inscription (dated 574 CE) of Simhaditya, the son of Varahdas (the king of Dwarka) and the minister of the city of Vallabhi during the Maitraka dynasty.

During the 18th century, the island, along with Okhamandal region, was controlled by the Gaekwads of Baroda. During the Indian rebellion of 1857, the Vaghers captured this region. In 1859, through a joint offensive with the British, Gaekwad and other princely state troops ousted the rebels and recaptured the region.

After Indian Independence in 1947, the area was integrated into the Saurashtra State. Later, Saurashtra merged with Bombay State under the state reorganization plans. When Gujarat was created from the bifurcation of Bombay State, Bet Dwarka was under the jurisdiction of the Jamnagar district of Gujarat. In 2013, it became part of the Devbhumi Dwarka district, created from the Jamnagar district.

Archeology
During investigations undertaken in the 1980s, the remains of earthen pots and other artifacts of the Late Harappan period were found. In 1982, a -long protection wall dating from 1500 BCE was found, which is believed to have been damaged and submerged following a sea storm. The artifacts recovered include a Late Harappan seal, an inscribed jar and a mold of a coppersmith, and a copper fishhook. The shipwrecks and stone anchors found during excavations suggested historic trade relation with Romans. The temples on the island were built around the end of the 18th century.

Places of worship 
Dhwarkadhish Temple and Shri Keshavraiji Temple are major temples of Krishna on the island. Additional pilgrimage places include Hanuman Dandi, Vaishnav Mahaprabhu Bethak, and a gurdwara. The small temple of Abhaya Mata is situated on the southwest side of the island.

Access
Bet Dwarka can be reached by ferry service from Okha. As of 2016, the Okha–Beyt Dwarka Signature Bridge—the first sea bridge in Gujarat—is under construction between Okha and Bet Dwarka.

The island is made of sandstone and is surrounded by several sand beaches. On the eastern side is a thin peninsula known as Dunny Point. Bet Dwarka is the first place in Gujarat developed for ecotourism, and temporary camps are set up for tourism during the summer.

Gallery

See also 

 Shivrajpur beach

References

Bibliography
 
 Gaur, A.S., Sundaresh, P. Gudigar, Sila Tripati, K.H. Vora and S.N. Bandodkar (2000) Recent underwater explorations at Dwarka and surroundings of Okha Mandal, Man and Environment, XXV(1): 67–74.
 Gaur, A.S. and Sundaresh (2003) Onshore Excavation at Bet Dwarka Island, in the Gulf of Kachchh, Gujarat, Man and Environment, XXVIII(1): 57–66.

Islands of Gujarat
Archaeological sites in Gujarat
Beaches of Gujarat
Tourist attractions in Gujarat
Hindu pilgrimage sites in India
Devbhoomi Dwarka district
Dwarka
Islands of India
Populated places in India